The National Institute of Statistics and Census of Costa Rica (Instituto Nacional de Estadística y Censos de Costa Rica, or INEC, in Spanish) is the governmental institution entrusted with the running of censuses and official surveys in the country. Its main office is located in San José.

History 
INEC was first called Oficina Central de Estadística about its foundation in 1861. Later, in 1951, it was called Dirección General de Estadística y Censos, until 1998, when INEC was its legal name. INEC ran its first census in 1864, and the latest was the 10th population and the 6th dwellings census, held in June 2011.

Censuses in Costa Rica 
 1864. First Population Census. 
 1883. Second Population Census. 
 1892. Third Population Census. 
 1927. Fourth Population Census.
 1950. Fifth Population Census. 
 1963. Sixth Population Census.
 1973. Seventh Population Census. 
 1984. Eight Population Census. 
 2000. Ninth Population Census. 
 2011. Tenth Population Census.

References

External links 
INEC website (in spanish only)
Central American Population Center website (in spanish only). Centro Centroamericano de Población (CCP), organization in charge of demographic studies at University of Costa Rica, has information about the historical census that can be accessed online.
First Population Census.
Second Population Census.
Third Population Census.
Fourth Population Census.
Fifth Population Census.
Sixth Population Census.

Costa Rica
Demographics of Costa Rica